MARC Train is the commuter rail system serving the Baltimore–Washington metropolitan area in the United States.  The system is owned by the Maryland Transit Administration (MTA Maryland), and serves Maryland, Washington, D.C., and West Virginia.  The system covers a total route length of  along three rail lines.  In the 2019 fiscal year, MARC Train service had average weekday ridership of 36,375 passengers.

State-supported commuter rail operations in Maryland began in 1974 when the Maryland Department of Transportation (Maryland DOT) funded train services from Washington, D.C. along the Baltimore and Ohio Railroad, later owned by CSX Transportation.   The following year, in 1975, Maryland DOT began funding operations on the Conrail-owned Northeast Corridor, whose ownership was transferred to Amtrak in 1983.  Following a marketing study in 1984, the Maryland-funded commuter rail service was branded as MARC (Maryland Area Rail Commuter).

Current MARC Train service includes the Penn Line (operated on Amtrak's Northeast Corridor), the Camden Line (operated on CSX's Capital Subdivision), and the Brunswick Line (operated on CSX's Cumberland, Metropolitan, and Old Main Line Subdivisions, with limited service along the Frederick Branch).  There are 42 MARC Train stations in the commuter rail system; all three lines terminate at Union Station in Washington, D.C, where passengers can connect with Amtrak, Virginia Railway Express, and Washington Metro trains.  Development of a new MARC station at the former Amtrak station in Elkton, Maryland began in 2014, with plans to open by 2040.

Lines

Stations

All stations located in Maryland, unless otherwise noted.

Former stations
This list includes stations abandoned since the beginning of public subsidies in the mid 1970s.

References

MARC Train